Mojca is a Slovenian female given name. Notable people with this name include:

 Mojca Božič (born 1992), Slovenian volleyball player
 Mojca Cater (born 1970), Canadian butterfly swimmer
 Mojca Dežman (born 1967), Slovenian alpine skier
 Mojca Drčar Murko (born 1942), Slovenian politician
 Mojca Erdmann (born 1975), German soprano
 Mojca Kleva (born 1976), Slovene political scientist and politician
 Mojca Kopač (born 1975), Slovenian figure skater
 Mojca Kumerdej (born 1964), Slovene writer, philosopher and critic
 Mojca Osojnik (born 1970), Slovene painter and illustrator
 Mojca Rataj (born 1979), Bosnian-Slovenian alpine skier
 Mojca Sagmeister (born 1996), Slovenian swimmer
 Mojca Senčar (1940-2019), Slovene physician
 Mojca Suhadolc (born 1975), Slovenian alpine skier
 Mojca Točaj (born 2005), slovenian comedian

Slovene feminine given names